This article has a list of schools in Malta, that includes schools in Malta and Gozo.

Church schools
Archbishop's Seminary - Tal-Virtù, Rabat, Malta
Stella Maris College - San Bert Street, Gżira
De La Salle College (Malta) - Cottonera Road, Vittoriosa
Immaculate Conception School - Tarxien Road, Tarxien
Laura Vicuna School - Our Saviour Square, Għasri, Gozo
Mater Boni Consilii School - Mater Boni Consili Street, Paola
Our Lady Immaculate School - Canon Bonnici Street, Ħamrun
Convent of the Sacred Heart School Foundation - Sacred Heart Street, San Ġiljan
Sacred Heart Minor Seminary - Triq Enrico Mizzi, Victoria Gozo
Savio College - Buskett Road, Dingli
St Albert the Great College - Old Bakery Street, Valletta
St Aloysius College - Old Railway Street, Birkirkara
St Aloysius College Primary School - St Francis Street, Balzan 
St Augustine College - G'Mangia Hill, Guardamangia, Pietà
St Benild School - Carmelo Street, Sliema
St Dorothy's Junior School - Depiro Street, Sliema
St Dorothy's School - Mdina Road, Żebbuġ
Saint Elias College - St. Venera Square, Santa Venera
St Francis School - Mnajjar Street, Birkirkara
St Francis School - Kampnar Street, Bormla
St Francis School - Ħriereb Street, Msida
St Francis Secondary School - Manwel Dimech Street, Sliema
St Joseph School - Dun Ġorġ Preca Street, Blata l-Bajda, Ħamrun
St Joseph School - Cathedral Street, Sliema
St Michael School - Canon Road, Qormi
St Monica School - St Bartholomeo Street, Qormi
St Monica School - Madre Theresa Spinelli Street, Gżira
St Monica School - Ponosomby Street, Mosta
St Monica School (B'Kara) - 1 May Street, Fleur-de-Lys, Birkirkara
St. Paul's Missionary College - Emanuele Vitale Street, Rabat, Malta
St Theresa School - Advocate Anton Calleja Street, Kerċem, Gozo
St Vincent School - St Julians Hill, San Ġiljan
Theresa Nuzzo School - Balbi Street, Marsa

Language schools
Ace English Malta - Bay Street Complex, St. George's Bay, San Ġiljan
AClass Academy of English - Alamein road, Pembroke
Alliance Francaise de Malte - St Thomas Street, Floriana
Alpha School of English - Arznell Street, St Paul's Bay
AM Language Studio - Manwel Dimech Street, Sliema
Bell Language Centre - Elija Zammit Street, Paceville, San Ġiljan
BELS Language Schools -  550 West, St. Paul's Street San Pawl il-Baħar 
BELS Language School Gozo - Triq Ta' Doti, Kerċem, Gozo
Berlitz Language Centre - Dragonara Road, Paceville, San Ġiljan
Brittania College - Melita Street, Valletta
Burlington Academy - Dragonara Road, Paceville, San Ġiljan
Capital Language School - Republic Street, Valletta
Chamber College - Edgar Bernard Street, Gżira
Circulo Cultural Hispano Maltes - Mikiel Anton Vassalli Street, Valletta
Clubclass Residential Language School - Mgħażel Street, Swieqi
Cultural English Tours - Guze' Ellul Mercer Street, Iklin
EC Malta - Marguerite Mangion Street, San Ġiljan
E F International Language School - St George's Bay, San Ġiljan
Easy School of Language - St Paul Street, Valletta
EEC-ITIS Malta Tourism & Languages Institute (previously known as EEC Language Centre), San Ġwann
Educational English Cultural Language Centre - Sliema Road, Kappara, San Ġwann
Elanguest English Language School - Ross Street, Paceville, San Ġiljan
English Communication School - St Pius V Street, Sliema
English Language Academy - Tower Alley, Sliema
English Language Institute
English Plus Language Centre- Upper Ross Street, San Ġiljan
ESE European School of English - Paceville Avenue, Paceville, San Ġiljan
ETI Executive Training Institute - Paceville Avenue, Paceville, San Ġiljan
Gateway International School of English - Jonju Street, San Ġwann
German-Maltese Circle- St Christopher Street, Valletta
Global Village English Centre - St George's Street, St Paul's Bay
HEIP School of English 112 Gorg Borg Olivier Street (Mellieħa)
inlingua - Guzi Fava Street, Sliema
Institute of English Language Studies - Mattew Pulis Street, Sliema
International House Malta - Swieqi Centre (IH Malta) - Sirk Street, Swieqi
Lasalle Institute - Oscar Zammit Street, Msida
Linguatime School of English - Tower Road, Sliema
Link School of English - Hay Street, Swieqi
Malta University Language School - Robert Mifsud Bonnici, Ħal Lija
M S D International School of English - Tourist Street, Qawra, St Paul's Bay
Magister Academy Ltd - Mensija Road, The Gardens, San Ġiljan
Maltalingua School of English - Boxer House, Birkirkara Hill San Ġiljan
Medela-Mediterranean English Language Academy - San Anton Street, Attard
Melita Language School Malta - Saint Rocco Street, Birkirkara
NSTS - English Language Institute - Gzira
QSI International School of Malta, Triq Durumblat, Mosta
Russian Centre for Science and Culture - Merchants Street, Valletta
International House Malta - Msida Centre (IH Malta) - Victor Denaro Street, Msida
Società Dante Alighieri - Old Bakery Street, Valletta
Sprachcaffe Languages Plus - Alamein Street, Pembroke
STS Education- Student Travel Schools (more than 20 countries worldwide)
The International English Language Centre - Tigne' Seafront, Tignè, Sliema
The Voice School of English Ltd - St Publius Street, Floriana
Universal Language Services Malta - Robert Mifsud Bonnici Street, Ta' Xbiex

Private schools
Accelerated Christian Academy - Constitution Street, Mosta
Chiswick House School - Antonio Schembri Street, Kappara, San Ġwann
EEC-ITIS Malta Tourism & Languages Institute (previously known as Malta Tourism Institute (ITIS)), San Gwann
E C Malta - Marguerite Mangion Street, San Ġiljan
European School of English - Paceville Avenue, Paceville, San Ġiljan
Garendon School - Mdina Road, Żebbuġ
Global College Malta - SmartCity Malta, SCM01 - Ricasoli
Insight Learning - Bishop Caruana Street - Żebbuġ
Jack & Jill - Manwel Bonnici Street, Burmarrad, St Paul's Bay
Kidstart Summer Club - Sir Michelangelo Refalo Avenue, Balzan
Linguatime School of English - Tower Road, Sliema
Little Angels School - Naxxar Road, Birkirkara
Newark Schools (Kinder, Junior & Senior), Parisio Street, Sliema
QSI International School of Malta, Triq Durumblat, Mosta
San Andrea School - L-Imselliet, Żebbiegħ, Mġarr
San Anton School - L-Imselliet, Mġarr
Elppin Prep School  - L-Imselliet, Naxxar
St Catherine's High School- 11, Suffolk Road, Pembroke
Skylark School of English - Victor Denaro Street, Msida
St. Edward's College, Malta - Cottonera
St Joseph School (Private Independent School) - Żbandola Street, Qormi
St Martin's College - Swatar Road, Swatar, Msida, Malta
St Michael Foundation Senior School - Naxxar Road, Tal-Balal, San Ġwann
St Michael Junior School - Alamein Street, St Andrews, Pembroke
St Patrick's Salesian School - St John Bosco Street, Sliema
Swn-Y-Mor Kindergarten - Gżira
Thi Lakin School - Attard
Verdala International School - Pembroke
Institute of Computer Education - Żebbuġ

Colleges in Malta and Gozo
St. Nicholas' College (Kulleġġ San Nikola) - Consists of the primary schools of Attard, Baħrija, Dingli, Mġarr, Mtarfa, and Rabat, Malta/Mdina
St. Benedict College (Kulleġġ San Benedittu) - Consists of the primary schools of Birżebbuġa, Għaxaq, Gudja, Kirkop, Mqabba, Qrendi, Safi, Malta and Żurrieq
St. Theresa College (Kulleġġ Santa Tereża) - Consists of the primary schools of Birkirkara, Balzan/Iklin/Lija, Msida/Ta' Xbiex, and Santa Venera,
St. Margaret College (Kulleġġ Santa Margarita) - Consists of the primary schools of Birgu, Bormla, Kalkara, Senglea, Xgħajra and Żabbar
St. Thomas Moore College (Kulleġġ San Tumas More) - Consists of the primary schools of Fgura, Marsaskala, Marsaxlokk, Tarxien, and Żejtun
St. George Preca College (Kulleġġ San Ġorġ Preca) - Consists of the primary schools of Floriana, Ħamrun, Marsa, Paola, Pietà, and Valletta
Maria Regina College (Kulleġġ Marija Reġina) - Consists of the primary schools of Għargħur, Mellieħa, Mosta, Naxxar, and San Pawl il-Baħar
St. Clare College (Kulleġġ Santa Klara) - Consists of the primary schools of Gżira, Pembroke/Swieqi, San Ġiljan, San Ġwann, and Sliema
St. Ignatius College (Kulleġġ Sant' Injazju) - Consists of the primary schools of Luqa, Qormi, Siġġiewi, and Ħaż-Żebbuġ
Gozo College (Kulleġġ ta' Għawdex) - Consists of the primary schools of all the villages of Gozo.

Attard
Attard Primary School Tumas Dingli - Hal Warda Road
Thi Lakin School Attard Zebbug Road

Birgu
Lorenzo Gafà Boys' Secondary School - St Edward Street
Skola Primarja Santu Rokku - St Edward Street

Birkirkara
Birkirkara Primary 'C' School - Anthony Valletta - Brared Street
Patri Manwel Gatt O Carm Sta Venera Primary - Fleur-de-Lys Path Fleur-de-Lys
Santa Teresa Girls' Junior Lyceum - B Bontadini Street, Mrieħel
Vincenzo Borg Brared Boys' Secondary School - Paris Road, Ta' Paris
St Monica School Primary and Secondary School  - Brigilla street
St Francis School Birkirkara
Learnkey Training Institute, Secretarial School, 83 Mannarino Road, Birkirkara

Birżebbuġa
Birżebbuġa Skola Primarja 'A' Kulleġġ San Benedittu - St Michael Street
Birżebbuġa Skola Primarja 'B' Kulleġġ San Benedittu - School Path

Bormla
Erin Serracino Inglott Girls' Secondary School - Queen Alexandra Street
Ġużeppi Despott Boys' Junior Lyceum - St Nicholas Street
Kulleġ Kottonera c/o Maria Immakulata Cospicua 'C' Primary School - Xandru Street

Dingli
St. Nicholas College - Dingli Primary School - 118, Main Street, Dingli. DGL 1837

Fgura
Dun Ġużepp Zerafa Skola Primarja 'A' - Kitba Street
Emmanuel Debono Decesare Skola Primarja 'B' - Kitba Street

Floriana
Antonio Galea Floriana Primary School - St Thomas Street
Prof Kurnell Lt Lorenzo Manche' Boys Secondary School - V Dimech Street, Ospizio

Gozo
Anton Cassar Primary School - J.F.De Chambrey Street, Għajnsielem
Dun Salv Portelli Primary School - Our Lady of Sorrows Street, San Lawrenz
Dun Salv Vella Nadur Primary School - Tiġrija Road, Nadur
Ġan Franġisk Agius De Soldanies Girls' Sec/JL - Fort Mizzi Street Victoria
Karmni Grima Għarb Primary School - Visitation Street, Għarb
Mons Giov Andrea Vella Zebbug Primary School - St. Andrew Street, Żebbuġ, Gozo
Ninu Cremona Lyceum Complex Victoria - F.Mizzi Street, Victoria
Patri Mattew Sultana Xagħra Primary School - Tiġrija Street, Xagħra
Peter Paul Grech Primary School Kerċem - Orvieto Square, Kerċem
President Anton Buttigieg Qala Primary School - Bishop Mikiel Buttigieg Street, Qala
Prof Ġużè Aquilina Sannat Primary School & Special Unit - Sannat Road, Sannat
Rosa Magro Primary School - Soil Street, Xewkija
Sir Arturo Mercieca Victoria Primary School - Vajringa Street, Victoria
Sir M A Refalo Centre For Further Studies - Fortunato Mizzi Street, Victoria

Gudja
William Baker Gudja Primary C School - St Mark Street

Gżira
Government colleges
St Clare College Gżira Primary
St Clare College Boys' Secondary Gżira

Church schools and colleges
Stella Maris College Junior School
St. Monica Catcholic Church School

English-language schools
The Chamber College
NSTS

Għargħur
Karmnu Sant Għargħur Primary School - St Bartholemeo Street

Għaxaq
Filippo Castagna Għaxaq Primary School 'C' - Gudja Road

Ħamrun
Our Lady Immaculate, School - Canon Bonnici Street
Dun Frans Camilleri Ħamrun Primary 'C' - School Street
Dun Ġorġ Preca Primary 'C' - Guze' Pace Street
Dun Ġużepp Zammit Boys' Junior Lyceum - Wenzu Mallia Street
Maria Assunta Girls' Secondary School - Joseph Abela Scolaro Street
Maria Regina Girls' Junior Lyceum - Mountbatten Street Blata l-Bajda

Isla
Dom Mauro Inguanez Primary School 'C' - Old Prison Street

Kalkara
Patri Wistin Born Primary School 'C' - St Philomena Street

Kirkop
Kulleġġ San Benedittu Boys Secondary School - St John Street
St Benedict Primary School Kirkop - St Benedict Street

Lija
Annibale Preca Lija Primary - Robert Mifsud Bonnici Street

Luqa
St Ignatius College Luqa Primary School - St Andrew Street

Marsa
F X Attard Boys' Secondary School - Simpson Street
Fra Diego Bonanno Girls' School - Balbi Street
Lorenzo Balbi Marsa Primary School 'C' - Balbi Street,

Marsaskala
Marsaskala Primary School - Dun Frans Bianco Street

Marsaxlokk
Guseppina Deguara Marsaxlokk Primary School - Arznell Street

Mellieħa
Maria Bambina Mellieħa Primary School 'C' - New Mill Street

Mġarr
Mgarr Primary Kulleg San Nikola
San Andrea primary, secondary and early school
San Anton school

Mosta
Carmela Sammut Primary School 'A' - Grognet Street
Carmela Sammut Primary School Kindergarten Annex - Sir Arturo Mercieca Street
E B Vella Primary School 'B' - Grognet Street
Lily of the Valley Girls' Secondary School - Wied Il-Għasel Street
Boys Secondary School - Zokrija - Biedja street
Sant monica school
QSI The International School of Malta - Triq Durmumblat

Mqabba
Mqabba Kindergarten Centre & Primary School - Valletta Road

Msida
International House Malta - Msida Centre (IH Malta) - Victor Denaro Street
St Thereza College - Victor Denaro Street
G F Abela Junior College - Guze Debono Square
Mater Dei School - Quarries Street
St. Francis school - Hriereb Road

Mtarfa
Mtarfa Primary School - Sir A.Freemantle Street

Paola
Giuseppi Agius Paola 'B' Primary School - Guze' D'Amato Street
Ġużè D'Amato Boys Secondary School - Guze' D'Amato Street
Kulleġġ San Ġorġ Preca, Ġużeppi Agius Paola 'A' Primary School - Guze' D'Amato Street

Pembroke
Bice Mizzi Vassallo Pembroke Primary - Alemein Street
Sir Luigi Preziosi Girls' Secondary - Falaise Street
St Patrick's Craft Centre - Sir Adrian Dingli Street
Sir Adrian Dingli junior lyceum / kulegg santa klara
St Michael Primary School - Alamein Road
St. Catherines High School

Pietà
Hookham Frere Pietà Primary School - Marina Strand
Institute of Health Care - Guardamangia

Rabat, Malta
Alfred Buhagiar Rabat 'B' Primary School - Ferris Street
Kanonku P Pullicino Girls' Secondary - Ferris Street
Patri Tumas Xerri Baħrija Primary School - Baħrija, School Street
Pawlu Xuereb Rabat 'A' Primary School - College Street
St. Paul's Missionary College - Emanuele Vitale Street
 Archbishop's Seminary - Tal-Virtù

Qormi
Ġużè Muscat Azzopardi Primary School 'B' Qormi - Manwel Dimech Street
Mikiel Anton Vassalli Boys' Junior Lyceum - Tal-Ħandaq
Primary School 'C' Qormi - Federico Maempel Square
San Sebastjan Primary School 'A' Qormi - Narbona Square
Handaq Middle School and Handaq Secondary

Qrendi
Kulleġġ San Benedittu Skola Primarja Filippo Zammit Qrendi - Kurat Mizzi Street

Safi
Carmelo Caruana Primary School 'C' Safi - Dun Guzepp Caruana Street

San Ġiljan
Dun Ġużepp Scerri Primary School St Julians - Lapsi Road
EC Malta, - Marguerite Mangion Street, San Ġiljan
Convent of the Sacred Heart StJulians

English-language schools
ESE European School of English - Paceville Avenue, Paceville, San Ġiljan
ETI Executive Training Institute - Paceville Avenue, Paceville, San Ġiljan

San Ġwann
Madonna tal-Mensija San Ġwann Primary 'A' School - Riħan Avenue
St Bernardette San Ġwann B Primary School - School Street

San Pawl il-Baħar
Patri Feliċ Sammut St Paul's Bay Primary School - School Street

Santa Luċija
San Tumas More Secondary School - Kaħwiela Street

Santa Venera
Skola santa tereza of Boys Secondary - St Joseph High Street
Vincenzo Bugeja Secondary School - Santa Venera
Saint Elias College - Boy's Secondary School of the Catholic Church

Siġġiewi
Ġużè Delia Siġġiewi Kindergarten School - Dr Nikol Zammit Street.  No longer part of School.
Ġużè Delia Siġġiewi Primary School - Dr Nikol Zammit Street

Sliema
Dun Ġużepp Zammit Brighella Sliema Annex - Blanche Huber Street
 Guze' Bonnici primary school 'C' -, St Joseph School St Francis secondary

Tarxien
Dun Karm Sant Tarxien Primary School 'C' - Tal-Barrani Road
Maria Goretti Girls' Secondary School - Tal-Barrani Road
Immaculate Conception Secondary High School

Valletta
St Elmo Primary 'C' - Merchants Street
St Albert The Great College - old bakery street
 Unilang - International School of Languages - South Street

Xgħajra
Ave Marija Xgħajra Primary School 'C' - Dwardu Ellul Street

Żabbar
Dr Frans Chetcuti Primary 'B' - Tumas Dingli Street
Santa Klara Primary 'A' - St Vincent Street

Żebbuġ
Institute of Computer Education  - Mdina Road
Dun Karm Psaila Boys' Secondary School - Sciortino Street
Dun Mikiel Scerri Żebbuġ Primary School 'A' - Bishop Caruana Street
Insight Learning - Private tuition in multiple subjects - Bishop Caruana Street
St. Dorothy 's Convent School - Mdina Road
Garendon School (TRIQ QABEL IL-KNISJA) Zebbug main road

Żejtun
St. Margaret College - Luqa Briffa Street, Żejtun
Dun Alwiġ Camilleri Żejtun Primary 'A' School - St Angelo Street
Dun Alwiġ Camilleri Żejtun Primary Kindergarten Annex - St Angelo Street
Żejtun Kindergarten Centre - Antonio Micallef Street
Żejtun Primary 'B' School - St Angelo Street

Żurrieq
Francis Ebejer Primary School 'B' Żurrieq - Dun Guzepp Zammit Street
Leli Camilleri Primary School 'A' - St Catherine Street

Secretarial schools
Malta Institute for Computer Sciences - San Gwann

Special-needs schools
Education Rehabilitation Centre (SATU) - Mtaħleb, Rabat, Malta
Guardian Angel School - Abela Scolaro Street, Ħamrun
Mater Dei Special School - Misraħ il-Barrieri Street Msida
San Miguel School - Pembroke
Skola Dun Manwel Attard - Wardija Road, Wardija, San Pawl il-Baħar
Skola Helen Keller - Kurat Mizzi Street, Qrendi
St Luke's Hospital Classes, Fairyland - Gwardamanġa, Pietà

Technical and trade schools
B'Kara Education Gardener's Section - Bishop Labini Street, Birkirkara
Design & Technology Learning Centre - N/S in Main Street, Naxxar
Drama Unit Marija Reġina - Mountbatten Street, Blata l-Bajda, Ħamrun
Fra Diego Bonanno Marsa Girls - Balbi Street, Marsa
Għammieri Experimental Farm - Għammieri, Marsa
Gozo Centre For Arts & Crafts - J.F.De Chambrey Street, Għajnsielem, Gozo
Gozo College School of Drama - Racecourse Street Nadur, Gozo
Johann Strauss School of Music - Old Bakery Street, Valletta
Furtu Selvatico Boys School - G.Stivala Street, Naxxar
School of Art - Old Bakery Street, Valletta
School of Music - Sannat Road, Sannat, Gozo
St Patrick's Boys Craft Training Centre - Sir Adrian Dingli Street, Pembroke

Vocational schools
Malta Institute for Computer Sciences - San Gwann
Institute of Tourism Studies - Aviation Avenue, Ħal Luqa	
International Academy of Hotel & Catering Studies - Guze Flores Street, Santa Venera
MCAST Agribusiness Institute - Luqa Road, Qormi
MCAST Gozo Centre (Xagħra) - Tiġrija Road, Xagħra, Gozo
MCAST Gozo Centre (Xewkija) - Soil Street, Xewkija, Gozo
MCAST Institute of Art and Design - Tarġa Gap, Mosta
MCAST Institute of Building & Construction Engineering - Naxxar
MCAST Institute of Business Management & Commerce - Corradino Hill, Paola
MCAST Institute of Community Services - Qrejten Street, Msida and Rodolph Street, Sliema
MCAST Institute of Electrical & Electronics Engineering - Paola
MCAST Institute of Information & Communication - Paola
MCAST Institute of Mechanical Engineering - Paola
MCAST Maritime Institute - Marina Street, Kalkara

See also

 Education in Malta

References

Schools
Malta
Schools

Schools